John Overton (born 2 May 1956) is an English former footballer. He made 195 Football League appearances for Aston Villa, Halifax Town and Gillingham.

References

Living people
1956 births
Gillingham F.C. players
Aston Villa F.C. players
Halifax Town A.F.C. players
English footballers
Frickley Athletic F.C. players
Association football defenders